Pandit Yogesh Samsi (born 17 November 1968)  is an Indian tabla player.

Early life
Yogesh Samsi was born in Delhi to renowned vocalist Pandit Dinkar Kaikini. Yogesh's father introduced him to music at the age of four. At the age of four he started learning the tabla from Pandit H. Taranath Rao. Later, he sought the guidance of Ustad Allah Rakha Khan, one of the greatest percussionists and father of renowned tabla player Zakir Hussain. He spent 23 years under the tutelage of Allarakha.

Career
Pt. Samsi has accompanied the top grade instrumentalists and vocalists and dancers of India, including Vilayat Khan, Ajoy Chakrabarty, Dinkar Kaikini, Bhimsen Joshi, Shivkumar Sharma, Hariprasad Chaurasia, Ken Zuckerman, Birju Maharaj, Pandit Ulhas Kashalkar and Ustad Rashid Khan. He strives to keep up his revered guru's word of preserving the tradition in the presentation of tabla solo. He also appeared in the first episode of Idea Jalsa with Shivkumar Sharma.

Awards
 Sangeet Natak Akademi Award for Tabla - 2017

References

External links
 Official Yogesh Samsi Website

Hindustani instrumentalists
Tabla players
Living people
1968 births
Recipients of the Sangeet Natak Akademi Award